Sepia bidhaia is a species of cuttlefish native to the southwestern Pacific Ocean, specifically the waters off the Great Barrier Reef (
to ). It lives at a depth of between 200 and 304 m.

Females of this species are slightly larger than males. They grow to a mantle length of 57 mm and 37 mm, respectively.

The type specimen was collected near Queensland, Australia. It is deposited at the Museum of Victoria in Melbourne.

References

External links

Cuttlefish
Molluscs described in 2000
Taxa named by Amanda Reid (malacologist)